Goose Lake is a natural lake in South Dakota, in the United States.

Goose Lake is a natural habitat of geese, hence the name.

See also
List of lakes in South Dakota

References

Lakes of South Dakota
Lakes of Codington County, South Dakota